Admiral West may refer to:

Alan West, Baron West of Spithead (born 1948), British Royal Navy admiral
Barrie West (born 1934), Royal Australian Navy rear admiral
John West (Royal Navy officer) (1774–1862), British Royal Navy admiral
Temple West (1714–1757), British Royal Navy vice admiral